Roy Edward Williams (July 8, 1927 – September 14, 2020) was a Canadian basketball player who competed in the 1952 Summer Olympics. He was born in Winnipeg. Williams was part of the Canadian basketball team, which was eliminated after the group stage in the 1952 tournament. He played all six matches. He was inducted into the Manitoba Sports Hall of Fame in 2009.

References

External links
Canadian Olympic Committee – profile

1927 births
2020 deaths
Basketball players from Winnipeg
Basketball players at the 1952 Summer Olympics
Canadian men's basketball players
Olympic basketball players of Canada